Arthur Kampela is a Brazilian-American composer, guitarist, and songwriter.

Compositions
Though Kampela has been associated with the New Complexity movement, his style evolves out of extreme extended-technique improvisational practices which remap the ergonomics of one instrument onto another (percussion onto guitar, or guitar onto viola).

An important aspect of Kampela's music is his development of micro-metric modulation, a formula for precisely controlled transition from any polyrhythm to any other polyrhythm, without either the tempos of the respective polyrhythms being directly related. (He has also participated in activities that revive the theories and practices of Swiss-Brazilian musician Walter Smetak). Kampela's rhythmic and timbral techniques are sometimes framed by a reference to Theatre of the Absurd and combined with electronics. 
Another aspect of Kampela's music is the fusion of vernacular Brazilian roots (bossa novas and samba) with subversive wordplay lyrics and atonal harmonies, which can be heard in his 1988 LP Epopéia e Graça de uma Raça em Desencanto… (‘Epic and Grace…’)
His compositions, particular his Percussion Studies for Guitar, have been performed numerous times around the world (North America, South America, Europe, and Asia), resulting in dozens of renditions on YouTube, and by ensembles such as the New York Philharmonic, Ensemble Linea, Momenta Quartet, and Ensemble Modern.

Career
Kampela has taught composition at Columbia University, New York University, Bates College, and Escola de Música da UFRJ (Federal University of Rio de Janeiro).

Awards and Commissions
Guggenheim Fellowship 2014
DAAD Artists-in-Berlin Program 2012-13
Fromm Foundation grant
International Guitar Composition Competition (Caracas, Venezuela) 1995
Lamarque-Pons Guitar Composition Competition (Montevideo, Uruguay) 1998
New York Guitar Festival 2008

Education
Kampela attended Conservatório Brasileiro de Música, Centro Universitário, then Manhattan School of Music where he studied with Ursula Mamlok. He continued his studies at Columbia University, principally with Mario Davidovsky and Fred Lerdahl, and earned a DMA (1998) degree. (He also studied privately with Brian Ferneyhough in 1993.)

Selected works
 Percussion Studies for Guitar, Nos. 1, 2, and 3
 A Knife all Blade, [uma faca só lâmina - after Joao Cabral] (string quartet)
 Phalanges, for solo harp (1995)
 Macunaíma, for orchestra
 Happy Days, for solo flute and electronics
 Exoskeleton, for solo viola
 Naked Singularity, for solo tuba
 ...tak-tak...tak... 
 Antropofagia, for electric guitar and large ensemble
 Between Fingers and Mouth (2022)

Publications
"Micro-Metric Rhythms and Noises Emanations from the Stochastic Cloud", In Sharon Kanak (ed.) Xenakis Matters, New York: Pendragon Press: 341–362
"The Exile of the Metric in the Dance of Pulsation", 2020, Journal MusMat, 4(1): 63–80
"A Knife All Blade: Deciding the Side Not To Take", Current Musicology, 67/68: 167–193.

References

Listening

Percussion Study 1 for Guitar (1990), Marisa Minder, guitar
Percussion Study 1 for Guitar (1990), Gian Marco Ciampa, guitar
Percussion Study 1 for Guitar (1990), Rob MacDonald, guitar
Percussion Study 1 for Guitar (1990), Rémi Jousselme, guitar
Between Fingers and Mouth, quintet, (2022) (world premiere)
Phalanges (1995,) Jacqui Kerod, harp

External links
Fromm Foundation portrait
Berlin Festival program note
Lecture at IRCAM
Festival of Kampela
Ensemble Modern's Re-inventing Smetak 
Escavador portrait
2009 New York Philharmonic premiere of Macunaíma 

American classical composers
American male classical composers
Columbia University alumni
20th-century classical composers
21st-century classical composers
Living people
21st-century American composers
20th-century American composers
20th-century American male musicians
21st-century American male musicians
Composers for the classical guitar
Brazilian musicians
Year of birth missing (living people)